The 1943 Kilkenny Senior Hurling Championship was the 49th staging of the Kilkenny Senior Hurling Championship since its establishment by the Kilkenny County Board.

On 8 August 1943, Carrickshock won the championship after a 3-06 to 1-03 defeat of Mullinavat in the final. It was their sixth championship title overall and their fourth title in succession. They were the first team to win four titles in-a-row.

Results

Final

References

Kilkenny Senior Hurling Championship
Kilkenny Senior Hurling Championship